The Smiling, Proud Wanderer is a novel by Jin Yong.

The Smiling, Proud Wanderer may also refer to:
 The Smiling, Proud Wanderer (1984 TV series), a 1984 Hong Kong television series
Swordsman (TV series), Chinese television series

See also
 State of Divinity (disambiguation)